Aleksander Kirikal (10 January 1887 Tõstamaa – 24 August 1940 Tallinn) was an Estonian politician. He was a member of IV Riigikogu.

References

1887 births
1940 deaths
Members of the Riigikogu, 1929–1932